Ethiopia Unbound: Studies in Race Emancipation is a 1911 book by J. E. Casely Hayford that is one of the first novels in English by an African writer and has been cited as the earliest pan-African fiction. It was first published by C. M. Philips in London. It has been described as "one of the most important contributions to the literature on African nationalism", which made a plea for a unified African nation.

Background
Set in both Africa and England, Ethiopia Unbound relies on philosophical debates between an African and his English friend, as well as references to contemporary African events and ancient African history, to provide a context for its exploration of African identity and the struggle for emancipation.

Reception
The book's reception on its initial publication ranged from comments in a letter from pan-Africanist Edward Wilmot Blyden — "The more I read 'Ethiopia Unbound', the more I see that it is not your book, but an inspiration. It has given me more joy and encouragement than anything I have seen for many years" — to a review in the New York Independent Weekly Magazine of 26 October 1911, describing it as "a volume in the guise of a story, which is but a disguise to set forth the way our Christian civilisation and our Anglo-Saxon arrogance appear to a black native of the Gold Coast of Africa ... who looks forward to seeing Africa belong to the Africans rather than to the Europeans who have partitioned it. The book is worth reading."

The Pittsburgh Courier reviewer said: "It is a serious book, written in a happy, hopeful vein, and discusses with masterful ability, keen logic and philosophical reasoning the great world question—the relation of the darker races to the dominant races and the cause of the impotence and helplessness of the latter. The author points out a way which he thinks will have the effect of begetting more consideration and respect for those dark races, which are being used as shuttle-cocks by the dominant, grasping, greedy nations of the world. 'Ethiopia Unbound' is a remarkable book." As described by The National Watchman (Topeka, Kansas): "Mr. Hayford weaves romance, poetry, history, modern Christianity, the evolution of race persecution and recent striving into a plea for fidelity to racial ideals which will bring about the freedom of which he prophesies when Ethiopia unbound will be a reality.

Decades after the book's 1911 first publication in London by C. M. Philips, a second edition of Ethiopia Unbound was published in 1969 by Frank Cass & Co, with an Introduction by F. Nnabuenyi Ugonna, who stated: "Ethiopia Unbound is undoubtedly one of the most important contributions to the literature of African nationalism." A centennial edition was subsequently issued in 2010 by Black Classic Press, edited by African-American scholar Molefi Kete Asante, who introduced it by writing: "This book is extraordinary in its optimism. One could approach the book as a novel, a philosophical treatise, a dialogue of rationalism an Edwardian romance, or as a meditation on love of self, family, and community. It is all of these and more because it is filled with Greek myths as reference and is a sound political tract on the contemporary strivings of the Turks and the Russians as well as British colonial life. Yet Hayford is certain in the end that there would be victory over the colonial oppression in the Gold Coast and that his people, the Fante, would enjoy their own freedoms and independence as citizens equal to any in the world. For him, this is the aim for the entire Ethiopian world, by which he means all of Africa. 'Rise, you mighty giant! Rise! Ethiopia will soon be unbound!' And so it was...."

Legacy
The author's grandson, celebrated designer Joe Casely-Hayford (1956–2019), would cite Ethiopia Unbound as having influenced his creative process through its central concept that "an immigrant can be conversant in an alien culture while retaining their other self", functioning both inside and outside two contrasting cultures: "It was about the idea of duality and double-consciousness, what W.E.B. Du Bois talked about, that when you're black you’re never just one identity; you're aware of both yourself and how you're viewed by the majority at all times. My grandfather wore Kente cloth to study at Cambridge, and Savile Row to visit family in Ghana. He didn't make clothes, but what he wore was political. He was very much interested in the idea of African emancipation and black people thinking in much broader terms than they had been allowed to."

References

Further reading
 Fraser, Robert (2001). "Lonely Londoners 1890's style: Joseph Casely-Hayford's Ethiopia Unbound", Wasafiri, 34, pp. 52–55.
 Stephanie Newell, "Ethical Fiction: J.E. Casely Hayford's Ethiopia Unbound", chapter 7 in Literary Culture in Colonial Ghana: "How to Play the Game of Life", Manchester University Press, 2002, pp. 135–157. .

 Wilson, H. S. (1969), "Ethiopia Unbound: Studies in Race Emancipation", in: Origins of West African Nationalism. History in Depth. London: Palgrave Macmillan. .

1911 novels
Ghanaian novels
Pan-Africanism
Books about Africa
Historical novels
Novels set in Africa